Matteo Barbabianca (died 1582) was a Roman Catholic prelate who served as Bishop of Pula (1567–1582).

Biography
On 28 April 1567, Barbabianca was appointed by Pope Pius V as Bishop of Pula. 
He served as Bishop of Pula until his death in 1582.

While bishop, he was the principal co-consecrator of Giuseppe Pamphilj, Bishop of Segni (1570).

See also 
Catholic Church in Croatia

References

External links and additional sources
 (for Chronology of Bishops) 
 (for Chronology of Bishops) 

16th-century Roman Catholic bishops in Croatia
1582 deaths
Bishops appointed by Pope Pius V